Valle de Ayora also called Valle de Ayora-Cofrentes is a comarca in the province of Valencia, Valencian Community, Spain.

Municipalities 

Ayora
Cofrentes
Cortes de Pallás
Jalance
Jarafuel
Teresa de Cofrentes
Zarra

External links

Comarques of the Valencian Community
 
Geography of the Province of Valencia